Forest Glade is an unincorporated community in Limestone County, Texas, United States. According to the Handbook of Texas, the community had an estimated population of 340 in 2000.

References

External links
 

Unincorporated communities in Limestone County, Texas
Unincorporated communities in Texas